Chandan is a 1958 Hindi-language film starring Kishore Kumar, Nutan and Mala Sinha.

Soundtrack

Awards
1959 Filmfare Award for Best Sound Design - Ishan Ghosh

External links
 

Films scored by Madan Mohan
1958 films
1950s Hindi-language films
Films directed by M. V. Raman